Jonathan McDonald Van Ness (born March 28, 1987), also commonly referred to by their initials JVN, is an American hairstylist, podcast host and television personality. He is best known as the grooming expert on the Netflix series Queer Eye, for his work on the web series parody Gay of Thrones, and for hosting the Getting Curious with Jonathan Van Ness podcast.

Early life 

Jonathan Van Ness was born March 28, 1987, to parents Mary Winters and Jonathan Lyle Van Ness, and raised in Quincy, Illinois. He said he comes "from a family of journalists", being the sixth generation of his family-owned newspaper. This refers to broadcast and newspaper conglomerate Quincy Media and the company's local flagship newspaper, the Herald-Whig; Van Ness's mother is the vice president of Quincy Media, and he is a descendant of the Oakley family, which has controlled the company since the 1890s.

When Van Ness was younger, he was sexually abused by an older boy at church, which laid the foundation for self-destructive behaviors. In his early teens, he used online chat to socialize with, and sometimes meet, older men for sex.

Openly gay throughout his life, Van Ness experienced bullying for his femininity and natural flamboyance. He "endured years of judgment, ridicule, and trauma." Of the time, Van Ness said, "Growing up I definitely put on every nail polish, every heel, every scarf – I definitely had my mom's knockoff Hermès scarves in my hair and around my waist – those were my skirts, and I loved it. ... But when I was really young, I had really femme-shamey, gender-shamey [reactions] when I would dress like that. When I would play with those things, I knew it needed to be ... behind closed doors." Although always comfortable in his gender expression and sexuality, he says it took time to navigate other people's reactions. In response to the bullying, he used humor as a coping mechanism and relied on a small group of close friends for support. Years later, in the late 2010s, he realized he was gender non-conforming and started identifying as non-binary.

Van Ness was the first male cheerleader at Quincy Senior High School and continued cheerleading in college at the University of Arizona, where he majored in political science. One month in his initial semester at college, he used up his monthly allowance on cocaine and, too embarrassed to ask his parents for funds, turned to sex work. His addictions to sex and drugs increased to also include methamphetamine. His grades fell, and he lost his cheerleading scholarship; he dropped out after one semester to pursue hairstyling.

Van Ness trained at the Aveda Institute in Minneapolis. After graduating, he worked in Arizona for five years, before moving to Los Angeles in 2009.

Career 
In Los Angeles, Van Ness found a job as a personal assistant at Sally Hershberger Salon. One day in 2012, at age 25, he fainted in the salon while doing highlights for a client's hair. Later at a clinic, he found out he was HIV-positive. He used the revelation to "get clean" from drug use and publicly shared his story, saying, "I want people to realize you're never too broken to be fixed." He worked at MoJoHair and Stile Salon, both in Los Angeles, which he co-founded with Monique Northrop of Arte Salon in New York City.

Media 
In 2013, while dressing the hair of friend Erin Gibson, who worked for the comedy syndicate Funny or Die, Gibson asked Van Ness to perform his recap of a Game of Thrones episode for Funny or Die, which became the Gay of Thrones web series. In 2018, Van Ness was nominated for a Primetime Emmy Award for Outstanding Short Form Variety Series for the series.

Since 2015, Van Ness has hosted the weekly podcast Getting Curious with Jonathan Van Ness. His podcast took off upon the airing of the first Queer Eye episode.

Beginning in 2018, Van Ness has starred as the grooming expert on the Netflix revival of Queer Eye.

Books 
Van Ness's memoir, Over the Top: A Raw Journey to Self-Love, was published in October 2019. His memoir discusses his past and how it helped sculpt his future.

In 2020, Van Ness released a picture book titled Peanut Goes for the Gold, which tells the story of a nonbinary guinea pig named Peanut and their adventures as a rhythmic gymnastics prodigy. Peanut is inspired by Van Ness's own childhood pet.

In 2022 Van Ness released a collection of essays in a book titled Love That Story: Observations from a Gorgeously Queer Life.

Personal life 
Van Ness identifies as non-binary. Although he has stated a preference for using the pronouns "he/him", he has also used "she/her" and "they/them" interchangeably. He explained his gender in an interview with Out, saying, "[S]ome days I feel like a man, but then other days I feel like a woman. I don't really — I think my energies are really all over the place. Any opportunity I have to break down stereotypes of the binary, I am down for it, I'm here for it."

Van Ness lives and works in Austin, Texas and New York City. He has psoriasis, a chronic skin condition, and advises clients on skin care. In 2019, he came out as HIV positive.

On April 4, 2019, Van Ness, Bobby Berk, Tan France, and Antoni Porowski visited Nancy Pelosi and Alexandria Ocasio-Cortez to discuss the Equality Act, a bill that would add sexual orientation and gender identity to the list of classes protected in the Civil Rights Act of 1964. On September 25, Van Ness announced his endorsement of Elizabeth Warren for president in 2020 based upon healthcare being a human right.

On June 23, 2020, Van Ness and Queer Eye costar Bobby Berk praised recent U.S. Supreme Court decisions that ruled that LGBT employment discrimination was a violation of the Civil Rights Act of 1964. Van Ness described the ruling as "a great step in the right direction." However, both of them still urged the United States Congress to pass the proposed Equality Act.

In December 2020, Van Ness revealed that he had married his partner, Mark Peacock, earlier that year.

Bibliography 
Over the Top: A Raw Journey to Self-Love (2019)
Peanut goes for the Gold (2020)
Love That Story: Observations from a Gorgeously Queer Life (2022)

Filmography

Television and web 
{| class="wikitable sortable"
! Year
! Title
! Role
! class="unsortable" | Notes
|-
| 2013–2019
| Gay of Thrones
| Jonathan
| Series regular, 45 episodes
|-
| 2014
| I Love the 2000s
| Himself
| Series regular, 10 episodes
|-
| 2018–present
| Queer Eye
| Himself
| Series regular, 58 episodes
|-
| 2018
| Nailed It!
| Himself
| Contestant, Episode: "3, 2, 1... Ya Not Done!!"
|-
| 2019
|Big Mouth
| Himself (voice)
| Episode: "Disclosure the Movie: The Musical!"
|-
| 2019
| Big City Greens
| Confident Stylist (voice)
| Episode: "Cricket's Kapowie"
|-
| 2020
| Sarah Cooper: Everything's Fine
| Arianne Zucker
| Television special
|-
|2020
|Spinning Out|Himself
|Episode 3, Cameo
|-
| 2021
| M.O.D.O.K.| Himself (voice)
| Episode: "This Man... This Makeover!"
|-
| 2021
| I Heart Arlo| Furlecia
| Main voice role
|-
|2022
|Getting Curious with Jonathan Van Ness|Himself
|6 Episodes
|}

 Films 

 Music videos 

 Awards and honors 
 2018 Nominated for Primetime Emmy Award for Outstanding Short Form Variety Series for Gay of Thrones2019 Nominated for Primetime Emmy Award for Outstanding Short Form Variety Series for Gay of Thrones2020 Nominated for Primetime Emmy Award for Outstanding Host For A Reality Or Competition Program for Queer Eye2021 Nominated for Primetime Emmy Award for Outstanding Host For A Reality Or Competition Program for Queer Eye2022 Nominated for Primetime Emmy Award for Outstanding Host For A Reality Or Competition Program for Queer Eye 2019 winner for Goodreads Choice Award for Memoir and Autobiography for Over the Top: A Raw Journey to Self-Love 2019 winner of iHeartRadio Podcast Award for Best LGBTQ Podcast (for his podcast Getting Curious with Jonathan Van Ness'') 
2019 winner of Critics Choice Award for Male Star of the Year

See also 
 LGBT culture in New York City
 List of LGBT people from New York City

References

External links 

 
 
 
 

American television personalities
Gay entertainers
American hairdressers
American podcasters
21st-century American memoirists
LGBT memoirists
People with non-binary gender identities
LGBT people from Illinois
People with HIV/AIDS
Arizona Wildcats athletes
University of Arizona alumni
People from Quincy, Illinois
1987 births
Living people
American non-binary actors
Non-binary writers
Non-binary activists